Camargo is a town in Dewey County, Oklahoma, United States. The population was 178 at the 2010 census, an increase of 54.8 percent from the figure of 115 in 2000.

History
The area that became the present town of Camargo was part of the Cheyenne and Arapaho Reservation until it was opened for non-Indian settlement on April 19, 1892. A Camargo post office was established on September 16, 1892. Two stories exist about the meaning of the town name. One claims that it was named for a town in Illinois, while the other claims Camargo meant "little dog" in the Cheyenne language.

Farming and ranching sustained Camargo's early economy. The Wichita Falls and Northwestern Railway (later the Missouri, Kansas and Texas Railway, or Katy) built a line in 1912 between Leedey and Forgan (in Beaver County that passed through Camargo. Bentonite was mined in the area and shipped on the railroad until the railroad ceased operating in 1972–3.

Sylvan Ambrose Hart, one of the last mountain men, was born in Camargo, the eldest of six children.

Geography
Camargo is located at  (36.017879, -99.287244). It is approximately halfway between Leedey and Vici on State Highway 34.

Demographics

As of the census of 2000, there were 115 people, 57 households, and 33 families residing in the town. The racial makeup of the town was 99.13% White, and 0.87% from two or more races. Hispanic or Latino of any race were 1.74% of the population.

There were 57 households, out of which 22.8% had children under the age of 18 living with them, 42.1% were married couples living together, 10.5% had a female householder with no husband present, and 42.1% were non-families. 42.1% of all households were made up of individuals, and 24.6% had someone living alone who was 65 years of age or older. The average household size was 2.02 and the average family size was 2.76.

In the town, the population was spread out, with 20.9% under the age of 18, 11.3% from 18 to 24, 17.4% from 25 to 44, 27.8% from 45 to 64, and 22.6% who were 65 years of age or older. The median age was 45 years. For every 100 females, there were 91.7 males. For every 100 females age 18 and over, there were 78.4 males.

The median income for a household in the town was $23,750, and the median income for a family was $36,875. Males had a median income of $32,083 versus $28,125 for females. The per capita income for the town was $20,417. There were 20.6% of families and 24.3% of the population living below the poverty line, including 20.0% of under eighteens and 46.7% of those over 64.

References

External links
 Encyclopedia of Oklahoma History and Culture - Camargo

Towns in Dewey County, Oklahoma
Towns in Oklahoma